The 13th Open Russian Festival of Animated Film was held from February 28 to March 3, 2008, in Suzdal, Russia.  The winners for all of the main award categories were announced on March 2.  The jury consisted of 33 professionals in a variety of different professions related to animation.  85 films, totaling over 14 hours of running time, were screened. This was the first festival held after the death of Aleksandr Tatarskiy, who had headed all the previous festivals. The artistic director in his place was Aleksandr Gerasimov.

Main awards

Other prizes

Jury rating
Each jury member was asked to list their top 5 five films of the festival.  5 points were given for a 1st place vote and so on, down to 1 point for a 5th place vote. An official award was given to the top three films at the closing ceremony.

External links
Official website with the results 
Breakdown of jury votes 
Breakdown of jury votes (categories) 

Ani
Open Russian Festival of Animated Film
2008 film festivals
2008 festivals in Asia
2008 festivals in Europe
2008 in animation